Toby Crabel (born 1955) is a tennis player who is now a commodities trader. In 2005, the Financial Times called Crabel "the most well-known trader on the counter-trend side". He is the fund manager of "Crabel Capital Management," which has previously ranked highly on Absolute Return magazine's list of US groups with more than $1 billion Assets under management. Crabel managed 3.2 billion dollars with growth of 16.7% in 2005. Crabel has a strong record of positive returns, having avoided a single losing year between 1991 and 2002.

Crabel released his book, Day Trading with Short-term Price Patterns, in 1990. Crabel is still an active tennis player and as of November 2021, was ranked No.1 seeded player in 65 and over age range.

Education 
Crabel attended the University of Central Florida and majored in finance.

Tennis career 
Since 1973 (age of 18), he has been playing professional tennis. In 1978, he was ranked as 328th player. He participated in Men's Double in 1980 French Open.

In May 2021, Crabel Capital, which is Cabel's company hosted a 65 over tournament competition. At the time Crabel was ranked as No. 2 seeded player in 65 and over age group.  

In November 2021, he won 65 and over single's championship held by New Orleans Lawn Tennis Club (NOLTC). At the time he was ranked as No. 1 seeded player in the 65 and over age group.

Financial career 
In 1975, while attending college. Crabel began to trade the markets.  In the late 1980s, Crabel published a series of articles detailing various short-term price patterns for futures trading. He worked as a trader for Victor Niederhoffer at his firm in New York, while also giving short-term market advice to floor traders. He left Niederhoffer Investments in 1992 to focus exclusively on managed futures trading. In January 1992, he started running his flagship Diversified Futures program. During 1998, he ran his hedge fund out of his house, located in a rural area northwest of Milwaukee. Diversified Futures closed to new investments in 2001 and had positive returns from inception through 2006.

He currently manages private client funds though Crabel Fund Ltd for non-US clients and through Crabel Fund LP for US clients. As of 2022, assets under management are $7.5Bn. Crabel manages these funds with a staff of 31 researchers and 28 traders.

Bibliography

See also
 David Harding (finance)
 Monroe Trout
 Richard Dennis
 Victor Niederhoffer

References

External links
 Official website
 Toby Crabel Price Patterns calculated daily for futures
 
 
 Referenced in Books
 Toby's Stretch Free MT4 Indicator

1955 births
Living people
American investors
American male tennis players
American money managers
American commodities traders
American financial analysts
American hedge fund managers
Stock and commodity market managers
University of Central Florida alumni